Supermodel, Season 2 is the second season of the Swiss reality show on 3+ TV, a competition of non-professional aspiring models for a contract with Swiss Model Agency Option, a cover on Swiss Magazin SI Style and a Renault Twingo.

German model Franziska Knuppe, who was a guest judge on Season 1 replaced Nadja Schildknecht as host, Yannick Aellen and Mike Karg remain as the two other permanent judges. Bruce Darnell, known in Switzerland for his role on the first two seasons of Germany's Next Top Model, coaches the 15 chosen finalists on the runway in his typical "dramatic" style.

Episodes

Episode 1: Das grosse Casting
Original airdate: 

 Title Translation: The Big Casting
 Challenge winner: Andrea F.
 Bottom two: Angela & Anja Reolon
 Eliminated: Anja Reolon
 Eliminated: Lauren & Imogen Macpherson
 Featured photographer: Siro Antonio Micheroli
 Guest judge: Sabine Diethelm

Episode 2: Die erste Auslandsreise
Original Airdate: 

 Title Translation: The first trip abroad
 Challenge winner: None
 Eliminated: Sara & Angela
 Featured photographer: Andrea Diglas
 Guest judge: Bruce Darnell

Episode 3: Sonne, Sand und Meer
Original Airdate: 

 Title Translation: Sun, Beach and the Sea
 Challenge winners: Jesica Martinez & Tiffany Kappeler
 Eliminated outside of judging panel: Andrea B. & Henriette
 Bottom two: Janine Rohner & Maja Hatibovic
 Eliminated: None
 Featured photographer: Klaus Behnisch
 Guestjudge: Barbara Eberle

Episode 4: Modemetropole Paris
Original airdate: 

 Title Translation: Fashion Metropolis Paris
 Challenge winner: None
 Eliminated: Janine Rohner
 Featured photographer: Frederic Auerbach
 Guest judge: Melanie Wininger

Episode 5: Jetzt wird's gefährlich
Original airdate: 

 Title Translation: It's getting dangerous
 Challenge winner: Andrea F. & Bianca Bauer
 Eliminated: Stefanie Thommen & Maja Hatibovic
 Featured photographer: Philipp Jeker
 Guest judge: Simone Bargetze

Episode 6: Sayonara Supermodels
Original airdate: 

Title translation: Goodbye supermodels
 Challenge winner: All
 Eliminated: Tiffany Kappeler
 Bottom two: Andrea F. & Radha Binder
 Eliminated: Andrea F.
 Featured director: Kuti

Episode 7: Finale
Original airdate: 
 Title Translation: Final
Final three: Bianca Bauer, Jesica Martinez & Radha Binder
 Eliminated: Jesica Martinez
 Final two: Bianca Bauer & Radha Binder
 Supermodel: Bianca Bauer
 Featured photographer: Hajime Watanabe & Mark Liddell
 Guest judges: Bruce Darnell & Sabine Diethelm

Contestants
(ages stated are at start of contest)

Summaries

Call-out order

 The contestant was eliminated
 The contestant was eliminated outside of judging panel
 The contestant was part of a non-eliminated bottom two
 The contestant won the competition

 In episode 3, Andrea B. and Henriette were eliminated outside of judging panel. At elimination, Janine and Maja were in danger of elimination, but neither of them were eliminated.

Photo Shoot Guide
 Episode 1 Photo Shoot: “Bergsteigen an den Alpen” (Climbing the Alpes)
 Episode 2 Photo Shoot: “Kuss Shooting” (Kiss Shooting)
 Episode 3 Photo Shoot: “Unterwasser Shooting” (Underwater Shooting)
 Episode 4 Photo Shoot: “Fechtende Rivalinnen aus dem 18. Jahrhundert” (18th Century Fencing Rivals)
 Episode 5 Photo Shoot: “Warten auf Adam” (Waiting for Adam)
 Episode 6 Video Shoot: “Rock Zombie Musen” (Rock Zombie Muses) (video clip for a Japanese rock band)
 Episode 7 Photo Shoot: “Geisha vs. Sumo” / “SI Style Cover Shoot”

Notes

References
Official website

2008 Swiss television seasons